St. Matthew's Cathedral is an Episcopal cathedral located in Laramie, Wyoming, United States. It is the seat of the Diocese of Wyoming. The cathedral is a contributing property in the St. Matthew's Cathedral Close, a historic district listed on the National Register of Historic Places.

History
St. Matthew's was established in 1868. The Rt. Rev. Ethelbert Talbot, the first bishop of the newly created Missionary District of Wyoming and Idaho chose Laramie as his See city.  He then led the effort to build St. Matthew's Cathedral from 1892 to 1896. The cathedral cornerstone was laid on September 21, 1892 and it was dedicated on December 17, 1896. The church was consecrated on August 11, 1901. The 1967 General Convention of the Episcopal Church created the Diocese of Wyoming. The first diocesan convention was held at St. Matthew's on January 30, 1968. The Diocese of Wyoming is contiguous with the state of Wyoming. The cathedral is a part of the St. Matthew's Cathedral Close historic district placed on the National Register of Historic Places in 1984. The other elements in the district include the Deanery, Hunter Hall (formerly known as Sherwood Hall), and the First World War Memorial Cross.

Architecture
New York City architect William Halsey Wood designed St. Matthew's Cathedral in the Gothic Revival style.  The structure is built of native sandstone that was quarried nine miles northeast of Laramie.  The church building is cruciform is shape with the bell tower and spire above the main entrance. The cross at the top of the spire is  feet above the ground and  feet above sea level, which makes St. Matthew's the highest cathedral in the United States.  There are 11 bells in the tower that were cast by Meneely & Co., of Watervliet, New York.  The clock on the tower was made by the E. Howard Clock Co. of Boston.

Several artists created the cathedrals stained-glass windows.  They include Heaton, Butler and Bayne of London and New York City, Charles Connick of Boston, and Rowan and Irene LeCompte of New York and Washington, D.C.

Organ 
The pipe organ was installed by the E.M. Skinner Organ Co. in 1925, Opus 523. It features four manuals, 51 ranks, and 3,111 pipes. The console was replaced in 1998 by a 1928 Casavant console, from Opus 1275, rebuilt by Morel & Associates.

See also
List of the Episcopal cathedrals of the United States
List of cathedrals in the United States

References

External links

Cathedral website
Diocese of Wyoming website
St. Matthews Cathedral Close at the Wyoming State Historic Preservation Office

Religious organizations established in 1868
Churches completed in 1896
19th-century Episcopal church buildings
Gothic Revival church buildings in Wyoming
Episcopal churches in Wyoming
Matthew, Laramie
Buildings and structures in Laramie, Wyoming
Historic district contributing properties in Wyoming
Churches on the National Register of Historic Places in Wyoming
Tourist attractions in Laramie, Wyoming
Historic districts on the National Register of Historic Places in Wyoming
National Register of Historic Places in Albany County, Wyoming
Cathedrals in Wyoming